Rocky Boy West is a census-designated place (CDP) in Hill and Chouteau counties in the U.S. state of Montana. The population was 890 at the 2010 census.

Geography
It is bordered by the community of Box Elder to the northwest. U.S. Route 87 crosses the northwest corner of the CDP, leading northeast  to Havre and southwest  to Fort Benton.

Demographics

References

Census-designated places in Chouteau County, Montana
Census-designated places in Hill County, Montana
Census-designated places in Montana